An Gúm ("The Scheme") was an Irish state company tasked with the publication of Irish literature, especially educational materials.
The agency is now part of Foras na Gaeilge. Its mission statement is "To produce publications and resources in support of Irish-medium education and of the use of Irish in general." It is the largest publisher of books in Irish in the country. Seosamh Ó Murchú is the current Senior Editor.

History
An Gúm was founded in 1925 as part of the Department of Education by Ernest Blythe, then Minister for Finance in the Irish Free State.
Its purpose was to ensure a supply of textbooks and general books which would be required to implement the policy of reviving the Irish language. Many of the early publications were translations of famous and contemporary English-language books, such as Dracula. There were some translations of other European authors, and, of course, Irish authors who wrote in English.
The agency provided financial support for native Irish-language writers and published original writing in Irish by authors such as Máirtín Ó Cadhain, Seosamh Mac Grianna and Tomás Ó Criomhthain. An Gúm regularly publishes new editions of many books written and published in the 1920s and 1930s.
An Gúm remained part of the Department of Education until 1999 when, with the Belfast Agreement, its functions were moved under the cross-border body, Foras na Gaeilge, which has a statutory obligation in respect of the publication of Irish language materials for education.

Until well into the 1960s, An Gúm also published musical scores, some of them expressly for educational purposes at Irish schools. During the 1930s and 1940s, this was one of the few publishing opportunities for contemporary Irish composers including Rhoda Coghill, Aloys Fleischmann, Redmond Friel, Carl Hardebeck, John F. Larchet and Éamon Ó Gallchobhair.

Offices
An Gúm was based on O'Connell Street, Dublin, for much of the 20th century, before moving to premises in a building on North Frederick Street, shared with the National Educational Psychological Service, among others. Irish is the working language of the office, which is laid out over two floors. The office incorporates a library of past publications.

Lexicographical publications
Many other dictionaries came out of An Gúm, such as those by Niall Ó Dónaill (Irish-English Dictionary) and Tomás de Bhaldraithe.

Current projects
As well as ongoing publication and re-publication of fiction and textbooks in Irish, with the necessary editorial work, An Gúm is home to several larger ongoing projects.

Foclóir Nua Béarla-Gaeilge
An Gúm is working on a project to develop a New English-Irish Dictionary. New Step 1, of planning and design, was completed in autumn 2004 and Step 2, writing of the dictionary, is currently in progress.

Séideán Sí
As part of its remit to develop educational materials and textbooks in Irish, An Gúm is developing an "integrated, enjoyable and child-centred course for the teaching of Irish which aims to develop the language, cognitive, emotional and creative skills of the child". The syllabus is specifically, but not exclusively, designed for use in Gaeltacht schools and gaelscoileanna, where teaching takes place through the medium of the Irish language.
Séideán Sí is a joint initiative of Foras na Gaeilge and the Department of Education. A wide range of materials are available, including books, posters, workbooks and cards.

Name
The word "gúm" means "plan", "scheme" or "project". The agency was also known, in its early days, as An Scéim Foillsiúcháin (The Publication Scheme).

References

External links

Book publishing companies of Ireland
All-Ireland organisations
1925 establishments in Ireland